Douglas Kear Murray (born 16 July 1979) is a British author and political commentator. He founded the Centre for Social Cohesion in 2007, which became part of the Henry Jackson Society, where he was associate director from 2011 to 2018. He is also an associate editor of the conservative-leaning British political and cultural magazine The Spectator. Murray has also written columns for publications such as The Wall Street Journal.

Murray's books include Neoconservatism: Why We Need It (2005), Bloody Sunday: Truths, Lies and the Saville Inquiry (2011) about the Bloody Sunday Inquiry, The Strange Death of Europe: Immigration, Identity, Islam (2017), The Madness of Crowds: Gender, Race and Identity (2019), and The War on the West: How to Prevail in the Age of Unreason (2022).

Ayaan Hirsi Ali and Sohrab Ahmari have praised Murray's work and writing on Islam in Europe. French philosopher Bernard-Henri Lévy has said of Murray, "Whether one agrees with him or not" he is "one of the most important public intellectuals today." Critics claim his views and ideology are linked to far-right political ideologies and accuse him of promoting far-right conspiracy theories. Murray has rejected descriptions of his politics as far-right, and believes that the term "far-right" is overused by the political left.

Early life
Murray was born in Hammersmith, London, by an English, school teacher mother, and a Scottish, Gaelic-speaking father who was born on the Isle of Lewis and worked as a civil servant. He has one elder brother. In an interview with The Herald Murray stated that his father had intended to be in London temporarily but stayed after meeting his mother and that they "encouraged a good discussion around the dinner table" when he was growing up but "neither are political."

Murray was educated at his local state primary and secondary schools, before going to a comprehensive which had previously been a grammar school. Recalling this experience in 2011, he wrote, "My parents had been promised that the old grammar school standards and ethos remained, but none did. By the time I arrived the school was what would now be described as 'an inner-city sink school', a war zone similar to those many of the children's parents had escaped from." Murray's parents withdrew him from the school after a year. He was awarded scholarships to St Benedict's School, Ealing, and subsequently Eton College, before going on to study English at Magdalen College, Oxford.

Publications
At age 19, while in his second year at the University of Oxford, Murray published Bosie: A Biography of Lord Alfred Douglas, which was described by Christopher Hitchens as "masterly". Bosie was awarded a Lambda Award for a gay biography in 2000. After leaving Oxford, Murray wrote a play, Nightfall, about the Swedish diplomat Raoul Wallenberg.

In 2006, Murray published a defence of neoconservatismNeoconservatism: Why We Need Itand went on a speaking tour promoting the book in the United States. The publication was subsequently reviewed in the newspaper Asharq Al-Awsat by the Iranian author Amir Taheri: "Whether one agrees with him or not Murray has made a valuable contribution to the global battle of ideas." In 2007, he assisted in the writing of Towards a Grand Strategy for an Uncertain World: Renewing Transatlantic Partnership by Gen. Dr. Klaus Naumann, Gen. John Shalikashvili, Field Marshal The Lord Inge, Adm. Jacques Lanxade, and Gen. Henk van den Breemen. His book Bloody Sunday was (jointly) awarded the 2011–2012 Christopher Ewart-Biggs Memorial Prize. In June 2013, Murray's e-book Islamophilia: a Very Metropolitan Malady was published.

In 2017, Murray published The Strange Death of Europe: Immigration, Identity, Islam, which spent almost 20 weeks on The Sunday Times bestseller list and was a No. 1 bestseller in non-fiction. It has since been published in over 20 languages. In The Strange Death of Europe, Murray argued that Europe "is committing suicide" by allowing non-European immigration into its borders and losing its "faith in its beliefs". The book received a polarized response from critics. Juliet Samuel of The Telegraph praised Murray, saying that: "His overall thesis, that a guilt-driven and exhausted Europe is playing fast and loose with its precious modern values by embracing migration on such a scale, is hard to refute." An academic review in the Israel Journal of Foreign Affairs acclaimed the book as "explosive" and "an elegantly written, copiously documented exposé of Europe's suicidal hypocrisy". Rod Liddle of The Sunday Times called the book "a brilliant, important and profoundly depressing book".

Other reviews of the book were highly negative. In The Guardian, the political journalist Gaby Hinsliff described Strange Death as "gentrified xenophobia" and "Chapter after chapter circles around the same repetitive themes: migrants raping and murdering and terrorising", also pointing out that Murray offers little definition of the European culture which he claims is under threat. Writing in The New York Times, Pankaj Mishra described the book as "a handy digest of far-right clichés". Mishra accused Murray of defending Pegida, of writing that the English Defence League "had a point", and of describing Viktor Orbán as a better sentinel of "European values" than George Soros. Writing in The Intercept, Murtaza Hussain criticised what he called the "relentlessly paranoid tenor" and "apocalyptic picture of Europe" portrayed in the book, while challenging the links Murray made between non-European immigration and large increases in crime. In Middle East Eye, Georgetown professor Ian Almond called the book "a staggeringly one-sided flow of statistics, interviews and examples, reflecting a clear decision to make the book a rhetorical claim that Europe is doomed to self-destruction".

Murray wrote about social justice and identity politics in his 2019 book The Madness of Crowds: Gender, Race and Identity which became a Sunday Times bestseller. It was also nominated as an audio book of the year for the British Book Awards. In the book, Murray points to what he sees as a cultural shift, away from established modes of religion and political ideology, in which various forms of victimhood can provide markers of social status. He divides his book into sections dealing with different forms of victimhood, including types of LGBT identity, feminism and racial politics. Murray criticises the work of French philosopher Michel Foucault for what he sees as a reduction of society to a system of power relations. Murray's book drew polarized responses from critics. Tim Stanley in The Daily Telegraph praised the book, calling Murray "a superbly perceptive guide through the age of the social justice warrior". Katie Law in the Evening Standard said that Murray "tackled another necessary and provocative subject with wit and bravery". Conversely, William Davies gave a highly critical review of Murray's work in The Guardian, describing the book as "the bizarre fantasies of a rightwing provocateur, blind to oppression".

In 2021 Murray published The War on the West: How to Prevail in the Age of Unreason. The book was characterised by Gerard Baker as an examination of attempts to destroy Western civilisation from sources within.

Media career 

Murray is an associate editor of The Spectator.

In 2016, Murray organised a competition through The Spectator in which entrants were invited to submit offensive poems about Turkish president Recep Tayyip Erdoğan, with a top prize of £1,000 donated by a reader. This was in reaction to the Böhmermann affair, in which German satirist Jan Böhmermann was prosecuted under the German penal code for such a poem. His book Bloody Sunday: Truths, Lies and The Saville Inquiry, had been longlisted for the 2012 Orwell Book Prize. He announced the winner of the poetry competition as Conservative MP Boris Johnson (former editor of the magazine and former Mayor of London).

In April, 2019, Murray spent weeks urging New Statesman journalist George Eaton and editor Jason Cowley to share the original recording of an interview between Eaton and Roger Scruton, with Murray branding the published interview – which attributed a number of controversial statements to Scruton – as "journalistic dishonesty". Murray eventually managed to acquire the recording, which formed the basis of an article in the Spectator defending Scruton, arguing that his remarks had been misinterpreted. It is unclear how Murray obtained the recording. The New Statesman subsequently apologized for Eaton's misrepresentation.

Murray has written columns for The Daily Telegraph, National Review, The Wall Street Journal, UnHerd, and the New York Post. He has also made appearances on the The Joe Rogan Experience, The Rubin Report, and Lex Fridman podcast. In February 2022, Murray became a Fox News contributor. He has been a guest on Tucker Carlson Tonight, Fox & Friends, and Watters' World.

Political views 
Murray has been described as a conservative, a neoconservative, and a regular critic of immigration and Islam.

Murray has argued that the term 'far right' is used far too often by the political left. He has also said that political parties previously identified as far-right should be recognised as being able to moderate their politics over time but has criticised some European parties and politicians that espouse what he considers to be genuinely extremist or hard-line and antisemitic policies. Murray has argued that there is an effort by the left to destroy Western culture and has argued that criticisms of Western leaders and philosophers are motivated by attempts to hurt the west. He has also argued that Anti-racism is a religion and that it has replaced the influence that Christianity once had on the west.

Islam
In 2005 Murray said there is "a creed of Islamic fascism – a malignant fundamentalism, woken from the Dark Ages to assault us here and now".

In the wake of the 2017 London Bridge attack, Murray blamed Islam as a religion and called for reduced immigration.

In 2008, Murray listed the cases of 27 writers, activists, politicians and artists – including Sir Salman Rushdie, Maryam Namazie and Anwar Shaikh, all three of whom had received death threats due to their criticism of Islam. Murray said that "Unless Muslims are allowed to discuss their religion without fear of attack there can be no chance of reform or genuine freedom of conscience within Islam."

In February 2006, speaking at the Pim Fortuyn Memorial Conference on Europe and Islam, Murray said "conditions for Muslims in Europe must be made harder across the board: Europe must look like a less attractive proposition. We in Europe owe – after all – no special dues to Islam. We owe them no religious holidays, special rights or privileges." After Murray refused Paul Goodman's offer to disown these comments, the Conservative Party frontbench severed formal relations with Murray and his Centre for Social Cohesion.

In 2010, Murray argued against the motion in an Intelligence Squared US debate titled "Is Islam a Religion of Peace?"

Murray described Islamophobia as a "nonsense term" which  "has the aura of a smear."

In 2009, Murray was prevented from chairing a debate at the London School of Economics between Alan Sked and Hamza Tzortzis on the topic "Islam or Liberalism: Which is the Way Forward?", with the university citing security concerns following a week-long student protest against Israel's attacks on Gaza. The debate took place without Murray chairing. The move was criticised by the conservative press, such as The Daily Telegraph and The Spectator.

In June 2009, Murray accepted an invitation to a debate with Anjem Choudary, leader of the banned group Al-Muhajiroun, on the subject of Sharia law and British law at Conway Hall. Members of Al-Muhajiroun acting as security guards tried to segregate men and women at the entrance of the event. Clashes broke out near the entrance between Choudary's and Murray's supporters and Conway Hall cancelled the debate because of the attempted forced separation of men and women. Outside the building, a confrontation between Choudary and Murray over the cancellation of the event occurred. Murray's Centre for Social Cohesion later published a study arguing that one in seven Islam-related terrorist cases in the UK could be linked to Al-Muhajiroun.

Murray has argued in defence of Muslim reformers in his writing.

Brexit 
Murray supported the 'Leave' side in the UK's 2016 EU referendum. In the wake of the Brexit vote, Murray expressed concern that the result "has just not been accepted by an elite" and said that the result "should be celebrated by anybody who actually believes in democracy".

Immigration 
Murray is a vocal critic of immigration. In March 2013, Murray claimed that London was a "foreign country" due to "white Britons" becoming a minority in 23 of the 33 London boroughs. In Murray's book The Strange Death of Europe, he writes that Europe and its values are committing suicide due to mass immigration; in the opening pages, he calls for halting Muslim immigration. In the book, he also details crimes committed by immigrants in Europe and writes favourably of immigration hard liner Viktor Orbán.

In 2018, Murray filmed a video for PragerU entitled "The Suicide of Europe". Writing in the news website Sludge, journalist Alex Koch described the video as "evok[ing] the common white nationalist trope of white genocide with its rhetoric of 'suicide' and 'annihilation'." Koch interviewed a senior editor at the Anti-Defamation League's Center on Extremism, Mark Pitcavage, who stated that there was "almost certainly prejudice in the video" and that it was "filled with anti-immigrant and anti-Muslim rhetoric". Similarly, the Southern Poverty Law Center described the video as a "dog whistle to the extreme right".

In September 2016, Murray supported Donald Trump's proposal for a wall along the southern border of the United States. In January 2017, Murray defended Executive Order 13769 which banned entry to the U.S. by citizens of seven Muslim-majority countries.

Gender and sexuality 
Murray is gay, and he is a supporter of same-sex marriage. However, he has said that he believes that homosexuality "is an unstable component on which to base an individual identity and a hideously unstable way to try and base any form of group identity". In his book The Madness of Crowds: Gender, Race and Identity, Murray defends conversion therapy, and asserts that homophobia has mostly been vanquished.

Murray has said that it is a lie that a man can become a woman. In September 2020, during an appearance on Joe Rogan's podcast, Murray compared accepting trans people to "late-empire sign of things falling apart". He has stated that he thinks there is no such thing as non-binary gender.

In September 2019, Murray said in a interview that women are held to a different standard than men when it comes to sexual behaviour, citing instances involving Drew Barrymore, Jane Fonda and Mayim Bialik behaving sexually towards men without backlash from the media.

Foreign policy 
In his book Neoconservatism: Why We Need It, Murray argues that neoconservatism is necessary for fighting against dictatorships and human rights abuses. Murray has called for continuing the War on terror on Iran, Syria, and any regime which supports terrorism. He has also said that he believes that the political left or right have no desire for foreign interventions since John McCain's death.

On June, 2013, Murray opposed U.S intervention in the Syrian civil war and wrote "as the composition of the military opponents has become clearer—al Qaeda-linked Islamists dominating one side, Bashar al-Assad's forces and Hezbollah the other—it has become obvious that the window of opportunity for outside intervention is closed". In 2021, Murray chastised the Biden administration for withdrawal of US troops from Afghanistan and for attempting to portray the withdrawal as a success.

Murray supported the Iraq War and wrote in 2004, "Iraq may be the big intervention of this generation. Success means the success of the Iraqi nation in a region of failing states and unprecedented freedom for a nation previously cowed by brutalism and ignored by pacifism. Failure means not only the failure of the Arab world to allow freedom and democracy to stick, and the failure of the civilized world to stand up to tyranny, but the failure and loss of many more lives in a country which finally found hope and a future." Murray also defended the war against critics on multiple occasions.  
On December 16, 2017, Murray lambasted a decision by the High Court to award large payments to Iraqi civilians who claimed they had been mistreated while detained by British soldiers calling it disrespectful to soldiers who served in Iraq.

In 2013, Murray condemned journalist Owen Jones for mistakenly saying that Israel had killed a 11 month old child in a military strike. Jones responded by criticising Murray for ignoring a UN report which reported an Israel airstrike had killed numerous innocent civilians. In 2014, Murray defended and supported Israel during 2014 Israel-Gaza conflict. Murray also defended Israel's right to defend itself, saying, "If you don't believe that Israel has the right to stop a group that has proposed repeatedly since its existence that it wants to annihilate Israel, if you believe that Israel doesn't have the right to try and stop this enemy, then of course you don't believe Israel has the right to exist; you believe Israel has the right to die." During a visit to Israel in 2019, Murray praised Israeli society, saying that Israel "has a healthier attitude towards nationalism than Europe" and lauded Israel's restrictive approach to immigration. In 2019, Murray supported the Trump administration's decision to formally recognize Israel's sovereignty over the Golan Heights.

In June 2019, Murray referred to Robert Mueller's investigation into Donald Trump and Russian interference in the 2016 United States elections as a "nothing-burger". Murray called the 2022 Russian invasion of Ukraine a war crime and a blunder. He has claimed that the Russian military are corrupt and inefficient, as well as praised the Ukrainians for attempting to defend their homeland. Murray has urged the Republican Party to support Ukraine, and has expressed disappointment in Republicans Matt Gaetz and Kevin McCarthy for not supporting Ukraine.

In May 2020, Murray rebuked people labelling the COVID-19 lab leak theory – a theory which states that COVID-19 came from a lab in China – as a conspiracy theory. He has advocated for punishing China for their role in allowing COVID-19 into the United States and has expressed concern over China's influence on American universities. Murray has also criticised TikTok, referring to it as "a piece of malware from China", and accused the Chinese Communist Party of using it to corrupt society.

Donald Trump 

In November 2016, Murray questioned US Democrats calling Trump sexist, homophobic, and racist, as they had also attempted to portray Mitt Romney and John McCain in the same way. Murray also said that Trump's foreign policy plans were less provocative than Hillary Clinton's would have been. In response to Trump being nominated for a Nobel Peace Prize, Murray argued that were good reasons to nominate Trump for a prize, citing his attempts to negotiate peace with Kim Jong-un and his policy towards Israel.

Ahead of the 2020 United States presidential election, Murray argued that while Trump had personality flaws and enacted certain policies he did not agree with, his re-election would be more beneficial for the United Kingdom in terms of foreign policy and Brexit than a Biden administration would be. Murray praised Trump for having brokered the Israel–United Arab Emirates normalization agreement, and wrote of the assassination of Qasem Soleimani: "American forces took out Iran's leading general, a man who had overseen the deaths of countless numbers of British and American troops, not to mention Iraqi and other civilians in the area, and Iran took it. Not least because they seemed to fear that they were dealing with a madman."

In 2021, Murray criticised the January 6 United States Capitol attack perpetrated by supporters of Trump, and said that Trump alone was responsible for stoking the riot.

The following year, Murray reiterated his criticism of Trump's behaviour following the Capitol riot, but argued some Democratic Party politicians were contradictory in condemning the violence and claiming the riots were a danger to democracy after they had endorsed the rhetoric of the Black Lives Matter movement during the riots that followed the murder of George Floyd and Hillary Clinton's claims that the 2016 election had been stolen. Murray also argued that the Trump administration had enacted strong policies in regard to immigration, Iran, and China and it would be a strategic mistake of the Biden administration to reverse them. However, Murray has also asserted that the Republican Party should distance itself from Trump's stolen election theories and not seek 2024 primary candidates based on Trump's personal approval if it is to win the next presidential election.

Viktor Orbán 

In March 2018, Viktor Orbán posted a photo on his official Facebook account of himself reading the Hungarian-language edition of The Strange Death of Europe. Murray has disputed the claim that Hungary is experiencing significant democratic backsliding under Orbán, and has called Freedom House's comparisons of Orbán's government to a dictatorship as "increasingly off-kilter". In May 2018, Murray was personally received by Orbán in Budapest as part of the "Future of Europe" conference, along with other conservative figures like Steve Bannon, and according to Hungarian state media had an individual discussion and photograph with Orbán.

Other activities 
Murray is on the international advisory board of NGO Monitor, a Jerusalem-based NGO described as pro-Israel and right-wing, which was founded in 2001 by Gerald M. Steinberg. , he is also one of the directors of the Free Speech Union, an organization established by Toby Young in 2020 which speaks out against so-called cancel culture.

Murray participates in the Intellectual Dark Web, a loosely affiliated group of commentators including Bret Weinstein, Dave Rubin, Joe Rogan, and Sam Harris.

Criticism 
A number of academic and journalistic sources have linked Murray's ideology and political views to the far right, the alt-right, the Islamophobic right or some combination thereof. Murray has also been accused of being xenophobic, chauvinist and racist, while he is regarded by others as "a great defender of free speech".

Critics accuse Murray of putting a socially acceptable face on what would otherwise be considered fringe ideologies. In 2012, Arun Kundnani, who has written on radicalization, wrote in an article for Security and Human Rights that the "counterjihadist" ideology expressed by Murray and other conservative intellectuals was "through reworking far-right ideology and appropriating official discourse... able to evade categorisation as a source of far-right violence". Nafeez Ahmed argued in Middle East Eye that Murray's support for free speech in the wake of the Charlie Hebdo shooting and the January 2015 Île-de-France attacks was "really just a ploy for far-right entryism". In 2019, an article in Social Policy Review described Murray's views as a kind of "mainstreamist" ideology that defies easy categorization as extremist while remaining "entangled with the far right".

Critics accuse Murray of promoting far-right conspiracy theories, including the Great Replacement theory, the Eurabia conspiracy theory and the Cultural Marxism conspiracy theory. However, he has indicated that he dislikes the term "Cultural Marxism".

Rebuttal by Murray

Murray has contended that he is frequently mislabelled politically, and that the mainstream right are unfairly conflated with the far-right in modern political discourse: he wrote in 2020 that in modern politics "up is down, [and] right is far-right".

In another Spectator article in August 2019, Murray again criticised what he perceived as the overuse of terms like "far-right", this time in reference to commentators, saying that since the election of Donald Trump and the Brexit vote "there has been an acceleration in claimed sightings [of the far right] and a blurring of the definitions". He contended that this was "wrong not just because it means that perfectly decent people are maligned, but also because distinctly dangerous groups are confused with harmless ones".

Personal life
Murray was a friend of the journalist Christopher Hitchens. After Hitchens' death, Murray praised him as a writer, thinker, and speaker.

Murray has described himself as atheist, having been an Anglican until his twenties. However, he has also described himself variously as a cultural Christian and a Christian atheist, believing that Christianity is an important influence on British and European culture.

Works
.
 .
 .
 
 .
 .
 .
 .
 .
 .

References

External links

 Murray's writings at the Gatestone Institute
 Why the Conservative frontbench broke off relations with Douglas Murray. Opinion piece by Paul Goodman at Conservative Home

1979 births
Living people
Writers from London
British atheists
English people of Scottish descent
People educated at Eton College
People educated at St Benedict's School, Ealing
Alumni of Magdalen College, Oxford
British political writers
British critics of Islam
Lambda Literary Award winners
British gay writers
British LGBT journalists
British social commentators
Critics of multiculturalism
English atheists
Former Anglicans
People educated at West Bridgford School
Anti-Islam sentiment in the United Kingdom
20th-century atheists
21st-century atheists
21st-century LGBT people
Fox News people
British conspiracy theorists